Deepak Maharjan (b: 21 April 1983) is an Asian Games bronze medallist from Bassigaun, Kathmandu Nepal.

Career

 Maharjan won a bronze medal at the Asian Games in Guangzhou, China in the 81 kg category which was Nepal's only medal in the Games.

Won Male Player of the year of Nepal which is organised by Nepal Sports Journalist forum in 2011.

References

Living people
1983 births
Boxers at the 2010 Asian Games
Asian Games bronze medalists for Nepal
Asian Games medalists in boxing
Medalists at the 2010 Asian Games
Nepalese male boxers
Light-heavyweight boxers
21st-century Nepalese people